İsmail Hakkı Okday (1881–1977) was an Ottoman military commander, who participated in the First Balkan War. He was of Kurdish-Crimean Tatar origin.

Early life and career
He was born in Athens as the son of Ahmet Tevfik Pasha, who was then the Ottoman ambassador to Greece, and later became the last Grand Vizier of the Ottoman Empire.

Education
He studied at Galatasaray High School, his education began in his early teens. After completing his officer training at the Military Academy he was sent to the Prussian Military Academy.

Balkan Wars and World War I
When the First Balkan War began in 1912 he took a break from training and was tasked to defend Ioannina. He completed his training in Germany to return to the Military Academy which was set up after the Balkan Wars. He served as a staff officer in World War I.

Turkish War of Independence
During the Turkish War of Independence, he served as the Division Chief of Staff and was awarded the Independence Medal with red stripes.

Diplomatic career
After the war, he entered the Foreign Ministry; as with Moscow, Antwerp, Plovdiv, Bari, Basra, and has served as Consul General in Vienna. Second marriage Ferhunde Hanım (Ms. Nazli's aunt, the mother of Bulent Ecevit) made with. He retired from Athens Consulate.

After his retirement he owned and lived in the Park Hotel in Ayaspaşa, he died there in 1977.

References

Military personnel of the Ottoman Empire
1881 births
1977 deaths
Ottoman military personnel of the Balkan Wars
Ottoman military personnel of World War I
Turkish military personnel of the Turkish War of Independence